Lioptilodes brasilicus is a species of moth in the genus Lioptilodes known from Argentina and Brazil. Moths of this species take flight in October and have a wingspan of approximately 21–22 millimetres.

References

Platyptiliini
Moths described in 2006
Taxa named by Cees Gielis